Justice Webster may refer to:

Bergljot Webster (born 1966), justice of the Norwegian Supreme Court
J. Stanley Webster (1877-1962), justice of the Washington State Supreme Court
Judith Webster, chief justice of the Provincial Court of Manitoba
Peter Webster (judge), English High Court judge
Richard Webster, 1st Viscount Alverstone (1842–1915), Lord Chief Justice of England and Wales

See also
Judge Webster (disambiguation)